is a prefectural museum in Miyazaki, Japan, dedicated to the natural history and history of Miyazaki Prefecture. The museum opened in the grounds of Miyazaki Jingū in 1971.

See also
 List of Historic Sites of Japan (Miyazaki)
 List of Important Tangible Folk Cultural Properties (occupation)
 Miyazaki Prefectural Art Museum
 Hyūga Province

References

External links
  Miyazaki Prefectural Museum of Nature and History

Museums in Miyazaki Prefecture
Miyazaki (city)
History museums in Japan
Prefectural museums
Museums established in 1971
1971 establishments in Japan